Horst Wohlers (born 6 August 1949) is a German former football player and manager, who played as a defender or midfielder.

Playing career 
Wohlers was born in Brunsbüttel, Schleswig-Holstein. He joined first teams of SC Brunsbüttelkoog and FC St. Pauli until his 1975 transfer to Borussia Mönchengladbach. He was a midfielder, who played during Borussia's golden years in the 1970s, when he won with Borussia the Bundesliga two times, the DFB-Pokal once, and the UEFA Cup in 1979. Wohlers made 95 Bundesliga appearances for Mönchengladbach, scoring six times.

He appeared in total 232 times in the Bundesliga, playing also for TSV 1860 München and Arminia Bielefeld until he retired from playing in 1985.

Managerial career 
After his playing career ended, he became a coach for Bayer 05 Uerdingen in 1989 assisted by his former colleague Rainer Bonhof. The Danish football association DBU contacted Horst Wohlers in 1990, because he was pointed out as the ideal replacement for another German, Sepp Piontek. Horst Wohlers was even presented as new national coach at a press conference, though he was still under contract at Uerdingen. This led to a public farce in Denmark, because Wohlers was never allowed to break his contract at Bayer 05 Uerdingen.  Therefore, the later successful Richard Møller Nielsen was appointed as new Danish coach instead.

In 1991, Wohlers became the coach of his former club FC St. Pauli, where his career as Bundesliga coach ended in the same year. He worked for a while as assistant to Horst Köppel in the Japanese J-League with the Urawa Red Diamonds.

In the 2004–05 season, he became the coach of Borussia Mönchengladbach II (or U23), which he led to the German third tier (Regionalliga Nord). His contract ended on 30 June 2010.

References

External links
 Horst Wohlers

1949 births
Living people
People from Brunsbüttel
Footballers from Schleswig-Holstein
German footballers
Association football defenders
Association football midfielders
UEFA Cup winning players
Bundesliga players
FC St. Pauli players
Borussia Mönchengladbach players
TSV 1860 Munich players
Arminia Bielefeld players
German football managers
Bundesliga managers
2. Bundesliga managers
KFC Uerdingen 05 managers
SC Paderborn 07 managers
FC St. Pauli managers
VfB Oldenburg managers
SV Eintracht Trier 05 managers
West German footballers
German expatriate sportspeople in Japan
Borussia Mönchengladbach non-playing staff